Sir William Henry Preece  (15 February 1834 – 6 November 1913) was a Welsh electrical engineer and inventor. Preece relied on experiments and physical reasoning in his life's work. Upon his retirement from the Post Office in 1899, Preece was made a Knight Commander of the Order of the Bath (KCB) in the 1899 Birthday Honours.

Biography
Preece was born in Caernarfon (Gwynedd), Wales. He was educated at King's College School and King's College London. Preece studied at the Royal Institution in London (Great Britain) under Michael Faraday. He later was the consulting engineer for the Post Office (1870s). He became Engineer-in-Chief of the British General Post Office in 1892. He developed several improvements in railroad signalling system that increased railway safety. Preece and Oliver Lodge maintained a correspondence during this period. Upon Lodge's proposal of "loading coils" applied to submerged cables, Preece did not realise that "Earthing" would extend the distance and efficiency.

Telegraphy
In 1889 Preece assembled a group of men at Coniston Water in the Lake District in Lancashire and succeeded in transmitting and receiving Morse radio signals over a distance of about 1 mile (1.6 km) across water.

Preece also developed a wireless telegraphy and telephony system in 1892. Preece developed a telephone system and implemented it in England. A similar telephone system was patented in the United States by Alexander Graham Bell in 1876. In 1885, Preece and Arthur West Heaviside (Oliver Heaviside's brother) experimented with parallel telegraph lines and an unwired telephone receiver, discovering radio induction (later identified with the effects of crosstalk).

Preece blocked publication of some of Arthur and Oliver Heaviside's work. There was a long history of animosity between Preece and Oliver Heaviside. Heaviside considered Preece to be mathematically incompetent, an assessment supported by the biographer Paul J. Nahin: "Preece was a powerful government official, enormously ambitious, and in some remarkable ways, an utter blockhead." Preece's motivations in suppressing Heaviside's work were more to do with protecting Preece's own reputation and avoiding having to admit error than any perceived faults in Heaviside's work.

Radio
In 1897, with Marconi radio experiments from Lavernock Point in south Wales to the island of Flat Holm, Preece became one of Marconi's most ardent supporters. He made various efforts to support Guglielmo Marconi in the wireless field. Preece gained financial assistance from the Post Office to help expand Marconi's work. Preece believed incorrectly that the Earth's magnetic field was critical in the propagation of radio waves over long distances.

He had a long-standing rivalry with Oliver Heaviside over his understanding of electricity. It was derisively referred to as "the drain-pipe theory" by Heaviside, because Preece relied on an analogy between electricity and water for thought experiments. Reportedly, he rejected and never understood James Clerk Maxwell's advances to mathematical physics, and insisted that adding inductance to a telegraph line could only be detrimental, even while Maxwell's and Heaviside's theory and experiments showed that inductance could help.

Preece once stated, conveying sentiments later expressed by Edwin Armstrong, 

Preece served as president of the Institution of Civil Engineers between April 1898 and November 1899.

References

External links

 Russell Naughton, "Adventures in CyberSound: Preece, William Henry".
 "100 Welsh Heroes / 100 Arwyr Cymru", 73. Sir William Henry Preece, Groundbreakers. Culturenet Cymru, 2004.
 Oil on canvas painting by Beatrice Bright of Sir William Preece

        
        
        
        
        
        

1834 births
1913 deaths
People from Caernarfon
People educated at King's College School, London
Alumni of King's College London
Knights Commander of the Order of the Bath
Welsh electrical engineers
Presidents of the Institution of Civil Engineers
Presidents of the Smeatonian Society of Civil Engineers
Welsh scientists
Fellows of the Royal Society
People from Caernarfonshire
20th-century Welsh scientists
19th-century Welsh scientists
20th-century British engineers
19th-century British engineers